Stormlord is a platform game developed and published by Hewson Consultants. It was released for the ZX Spectrum, Commodore 64, Amiga, Atari ST, Amstrad CPC, and MS-DOS. It was ported to the Sega Genesis by Punk Development for Razorsoft and published in 1990.

It was followed by a sequel, Deliverance: Stormlord II.

Gameplay

The player can eliminate enemies by throwing a star-like weapon and travel rapidly from place to place by means of a particularly-powerful trampoline. In certain versions, this was replaced by a falcon.  However, sometimes the journeys must be carefully planned out, since the falcon can transport the player on one-way trips, and if all fairies have not been freed from the previous area, it will be impossible to win. The player has a limited amount of time to finish (before the sunset).

Ports 
Sega of America pulled the Genesis edition of the game off the market and forced Razorsoft to give clothing to cover up the faries' bare breasts. Indeed, certain advertisements for the game often made note of the controversy. In August 1991 Sega also announced that it was bringing legal action against RazorSoft for unauthorized use of Sega's "trademarks, copyrights and logos," and a breach of contract. Yet, programmer Kevin Seghetti stated that the changes on the Genesis version were done voluntarily.

However, when Amstrad Action gave the complete CPC version of the game away on their free covertape they edited the code of the game to cover up the fairies with a black square. This was due to avoid controversy with their young readership, or their parents.

Reception
CRASH reviewed the game in their May 1989 issue, giving the game their CRASH Smash award and an overall 91% rating: "Stormlord is immensely playable, highly addictive and a great CRASH Smash." Your Sinclair gave the game a 93 rating stating that the game was "another stormer from Raffaele Cecco. Buy it!" Entertainment Weekly gave the game a B and wrote that the game requires players to think and strategize. In 2010, UGO included Stormlord in the article "25 Sexy Video Game Secrets".

In 2009, GamesRadar included it among the games "with untapped franchise potential", commenting: "Nowadays, thanks to games like Conan and God of War, bare-chested men are free to rescue bare-chested women and Stormlord is ripe for a comeback."

The Spanish magazine Microhobby valued the game with the following scores: Originality: 70% Graphics: 90% Motion: 90% Sound: 80% Difficulty: 90% Addiction: 100%

References

External links

Remake for Oric 

1989 video games
Amiga games
Amstrad CPC games
Atari ST games
Commodore 64 games
DOS games
Fantasy video games
Hewson Consultants games
Oric games
Sega Genesis games
Single-player video games
Symbian games
Video games developed in the United Kingdom
Video games scored by Charles Deenen
Video games scored by Jeroen Tel
Video games scored by Jochen Hippel
ZX Spectrum games